Wie das Wispern des Windes  (English - Like the whispering of the wind) is an album by German musician Hans-Joachim Roedelius, released in Norway by independent record label Cicada Records in 1986.

The album contains ambient piano music. The music was recorded between 1983 and 1985 in Roedelius` home, a friend's house and at the Bloomsbury Theatre in London. The music was written, performed, recorded and produced by Roedelius. He also designed the album cover.

Track listing 
Side A
 Brise (breeze)
 Das Eis bricht (breaking ice)
 Unter blühenden Bäumen - Livemitschnitt (Live-cut - beneath blooming trees).

Side B
 Bergan (uphill)
 Regentropfen (raindrops)
 ...und nichts zu suchen (...and searching for nothing...)

1986 albums
Hans-Joachim Roedelius albums